Comptosia is a genus of bee flies (insects in the family Bombyliidae). There are at least 62 described species including the common Australian insects Comptosia apicalis, Comptosia neobiguttata and Comptosia insignis.

References

Bombyliidae genera
Taxa named by Pierre-Justin-Marie Macquart